The Embassy of the United States of America in Mexico City is the diplomatic mission of United States of America to the United Mexican States. The embassy's chancery is situated on the Paseo de la Reforma, Colonia Cuauhtémoc, Mexico City. Ken Salazar is the current United States Ambassador to Mexico.

History
The current chancery building began in 1960 and was completed in 1964 at a cost of US$5 million. At the time, it was the second largest United States embassy building in the world.

Future
In 2011, the United States Department of State announced plans to build a new United States embassy in the Nuevo Polanco neighborhood of Mexico City. Estimated price of the new embassy is US$763 million.

On February 13, 2018, construction of the new embassy began. The estimated cost is nearly US$1 billion ($943 million); it is expected to be completed in 2022.

Embassy sections
The Embassy exercises a number of functions in its representation to the Government of Mexico, including political, administrative, economic, public diplomacy and consular affairs, that are managed under the Ambassador by counselors from the U.S. Department of State.

Consular Section
American Citizen Services
Visa Services
Economic Section
Defense Attaché
Public Affairs
Political Section
Management Section
Other U.S. Government Agencies
American Battle Monuments Commission
Animal and Plant Health Inspection Service
Drug Enforcement Administration
Food and Drug Administration
Foreign Agricultural Service
Internal Revenue Service
Office of Foreign Assets Control
U.S. Agency for International Development
United States Commercial Service
United States Department of Defense
United States Department of Justice
U.S. Customs and Border Protection
U.S. Immigration and Customs Enforcement
United States Marshals Service
United States Peace Corps

Consulates
The United States maintains consulates general in Ciudad Juárez, Guadalajara, Hermosillo, Matamoros, Mérida, Monterrey, Nogales, Nuevo Laredo and Tijuana and consular agencies in Acapulco, Los Cabos, Cancún, Mazatlán, Oaxaca City, Piedras Negras, Playa del Carmen, Puerto Vallarta and San Miguel de Allende.

See also

American immigration to Mexico
Embassy of Mexico, Washington, D.C.
Mexico–United States relations

References

External links
 Embassy Home Page

United States
Mexico City
Buildings and structures in Mexico City
Cuauhtémoc, Mexico City
Paseo de la Reforma
Mexico–United States relations